The women's field hockey tournament at the 1980 Summer Olympics was the edition of the field hockey event at the Summer Olympic Games. It was held over a six-day period beginning on 25 July, and culminating on 31 July 1980. Games were played across two venues in Moscow, at the Minor Arena at Dynamo Stadium and Young Pioneers Stadium.

Zimbabwe won the gold medal finishing top of the pool at the conclusion of the pool stage. Czechoslovakia and the Soviet Union won the silver and bronze respectively, finishing in second and third place in the pool.

Qualification
In 1980, there was an International Federation of Women's Hockey Associations (IFWHA), separate from the predominantly male Fédération Internationale de Hockey (FIH). Because the FIH was the international federation affiliated to the International Olympic Committee, it supervised the Olympic tournament.

The FIH and IFWHA agreed that qualification for the Olympics would be decided by a joint FIH–IFWHA committee based on the results over the previous two years, including the 1978 (FIH) and 1979 (IFWHA) women's world championships.

Five teams qualified to join the host Soviet team:  the Netherlands, West Germany, the United States, New Zealand, and Great Britain (taking the place of Wales, England, and Scotland, who had finished 5th, 6th, and 7th respectively in the 1979 tournament).

However, all five of these teams boycotted to protest the Soviet invasion of Afghanistan. The United States and West Germany boycotted completely, and while  New Zealand, Great Britain and the Netherlands competed in other sports, their hockey governing bodies pulled out.

This threw the tournament into chaos. Subsequently, the organising committee sent out invitations to other countries, though Ireland declined their invitation.

Squads

Results

Pool

Pool matches

Medal Winning Squads

Statistics

Final rankings
 Zimbabwe
 Czechoslovakia
 Soviet Union
 India
 Austria
 Poland

Goalscorers
6 Goals

 Natella Krasnikova
 Patricia McKillop

5 Goals

 Natalia Buzunova

4 Goals

 Rup Kumari Saini

3 Goals

 Jiřina Čermáková
 Elizabeth Chase

2 Goals

 Brigitte Kindler
 Andrea Porsch
 Ida Hubáčková
 Jiřina Kadlecová
 Nisha Sharma
 Prem Maya Sonir

1 Goal

 Regina Lorenz
 Elisabeth Pistauer
 Jiřina Hájková
 Alena Kyselicová
 Jana Lahodová
 Lorraine Fernandes
 Sandra Chick
 Gillian Cowley
 Patricia Davies
 Linda Watson

References

External links
Official FIH website

1980
Women's tournament
1980 in women's field hockey
International women's field hockey competitions hosted by Russia
Field